Rhapis excelsa, also known as broadleaf lady palm or bamboo palm, is a species of fan palm (Arecaceae subfamily Coryphoideae, tribe Trachycarpeae) in the genus Rhapis, probably native to southern China and Taiwan. It is not known in the wild; all known plants come from cultivated groups in China. They were first collected by the Japanese for Tokugawa shogunate palaces, then popularity spread to Europe, and later to America where its low light and humidity requirements make it a common feature in malls and offices.  The genus name is Greek - rhapis, meaning "needle"; and the species name is Latin for "tall", though R. excelsa is not the tallest in the genus.

Description
Rhapis excelsa grows up to 4 m in height and 30 mm in diameter in multi-stemmed clumps with glossy, palmate evergreen leaves divided into broad, ribbed segments. Leaf segments are single or few in young plants and increase to a dozen or more in mature plants; segments are divided to the petiole. Leaf-ends are saw-toothed unlike most other palms, occurring on slender petioles ranging from 20 to 60 cm in length.  New foliage emerges from a fibrous sheath which remains attached to the base. As the plants age, the sheaths fall, revealing the bamboo-like trunks.  This usually dioecious palm species produces a small inflorescence at the top of the plant with spirally-arranged, fleshy yellow flowers containing three petals fused at the base.  Ripe fruit are fleshy and white, though R. excelsa more readily propagates via underground rhizome offshoots.

In the UK this plant has gained the Royal Horticultural Society’s Award of Garden Merit.

Gallery

References

Moore, H. E., Jr. (1963). An annotated checklist of cultivated palms. Principes 7: 162, 180.S
Zhong Guo & Hua Jing. (1993). China Floral Encyclopaedia

External links 

PACSAO.org

excelsa
Flora of China